Denise Turner Roth (born 1974) is an American government official who served as Administrator of General Services Administration from 2015 to January 2017. Her appointment to that position was confirmed in August 2015.

Early life and education 
Born in Washington, D.C., Roth attended Bishop O'Connell High School in Arlington, VA.  Roth earned a Bachelor of Arts degree in political science from George Mason University and a Graduate diploma from the Public Executive Leadership Academy at the University of North Carolina at Chapel Hill.

Career 
Before joining the General Services Administration, Roth worked as the Greensboro, North Carolina City Manager. In 2015, Roth was nominated to serve as Administrator of the General Services Administration, succeeding Dan Tangherlini, who had been serving in an acting capacity. Roth left the GSA shortly after the Inauguration of Donald Trump to work as a senior advisor and chief development officer at WSP USA, a design and engineering firm.

References

1974 births
Administrators of the General Services Administration
Living people
George Mason University alumni
University of North Carolina at Chapel Hill alumni
People from Washington, D.C.
Obama administration personnel